Nicholas Smith (born 15 November 1969 in Stratford-upon-Avon) is a British slalom canoeist who competed from the mid-1990s to the late 2000s.

Competing in two Summer Olympics, he earned his best finish of fourth in the C2 event in Sydney in 2000.

His partner in the C2 boat for most of his active career was Stuart Bowman (1997-2006). He also paddled with Daniel Goddard (2007-2008).

Smith studied commerce at Birmingham University and graduated with a BCom degree in 1991.

World Cup individual podiums

References

1969 births
English male canoeists
Canoeists at the 2000 Summer Olympics
Canoeists at the 2004 Summer Olympics
Living people
Olympic canoeists of Great Britain
People from Stratford-upon-Avon
Alumni of the University of Birmingham
British male canoeists